The 1999–2000 DFB-Pokal was the 57th season of the annual German football cup competition. It began on 31 July 1999 and ended on 6 May 2000. In the final Bayern Munich defeated Werder Bremen 3–0 to take their tenth title.

Matches

First round

Second round

Third round

Round of 16

Quarter-finals

Semi-finals

Final

References

External links
 Official site of the DFB 
 Kicker.de 

1999-2000
1999–2000 in German football cups